The Montanuniversität Leoben in Austria is the country's university for mining, metallurgy and materials. 
It was founded on 4 November 1840 as the Steiermärkisch-Ständische Montanlehranstalt in Vordernberg,
Styria, Austria's mining region. In 1849 Peter Tunner relocated the university to nearby Leoben. That year the university had a mere 48 students enrolled.

The University of Leoben is a member of TU Austria, an association of three Austrian universities of technology and offers education and conducts research in the fields of mining, metallurgy and materials science.

Name
The university itself uses its German name Montanuniversität Leoben in their English communications, the Austrian Ministry of Education, Science and Research calls the university the Leoben University Mining and Metallurgy [sic] in English and the Legal Information System of the Republic of Austria calls the university the University of Mining Leoben in the English translation of the Universities Act 2002.

Departments
Currently, the university has the following departments:
 Department of Analytical and Physical Chemistry
 Department of Polymer Engineering and Science
 Institute of Electrical Engineering
 Department of Geoscience and Geophysics
 Department of Materials Science
 Institute for Structural and Functional Ceramics
 Department of Mathematics and Information Technology
 Institute of Mechanical Engineering

 Department of Metallurgy
 Department Mineral Resources and Petroleum Engineering
 Department of Product Engineering
 Department of Economics
 Institute for Process Technology and Industrial Environmental Protection

See also 
TU Austria

References

External links
 Official website (in German)
 Official website (in English)

 
Universities and colleges in Austria
Leoben
Educational institutions established in 1840
Buildings and structures in Styria
Education in Styria
1840 establishments in Europe